The 1960 European Nations' Cup round of 16 was the second round of the qualifying competition for the 1960 European Nations' Cup. It was contested by Czechoslovakia, the preliminary round winners, along with fifteen other countries that had received a bye. The winners of each of eight home and away ties entered the quarter-finals. The matches were played between September 1958 and October 1959.

Qualification

The Republic of Ireland and Czechoslovakia faced each other in a two-legged tie, with Czechoslovakia winning and progressing to the round of 16.

Summary

|}

Matches
The eight matches took place over two legs, taking place in 1958 and 1959. All times are CET (UTC+1).

Soviet Union won 4–1 on aggregate and advanced to the quarter-finals.

France won 8–2 on aggregate and advanced to the quarter-finals.

Romania won 3–2 on aggregate and advanced to the quarter-finals.

Austria won 6–2 on aggregate and advanced to the quarter-finals.

Yugoslavia won 3–1 on aggregate and advanced to the quarter-finals.

Portugal won 5–2 on aggregate and advanced to the quarter-finals.

Spain won 7–2 on aggregate and advanced to the quarter-finals.

Czechoslovakia won 7–3 on aggregate and advanced to the quarter-finals.

Goalscorers

References

External links
Matches at UEFA.com

First round
1958 in Soviet football
1959 in Soviet football
1958–59 in Hungarian football
1959–60 in Hungarian football
1958–59 in French football
1958–59 in Greek football
1958–59 in Romanian football
1958–59 in Turkish football
1959 in Norwegian football
1959–60 in Austrian football
1959–60 in Yugoslav football
1959–60 in Bulgarian football
1959 in East German football
1959–60 in Portuguese football
1959 in Polish football
1959–60 in Spanish football
1959 in Danish football
1959–60 in Czechoslovak football
Czechoslovakia at the 1960 European Nations' Cup
France at the 1960 European Nations' Cup
Soviet Union at the 1960 European Nations' Cup
Yugoslavia at the 1960 European Nations' Cup